The 2009 mayoral election in Allentown, Pennsylvania was held on November 3, 2009, and resulted in the incumbent mayor Ed Pawlowski, a member of the Democratic Party, being re-elected to a second term over Republican Party candidate Tony Phillips.

Background

Incumbent mayor Ed Pawlowski was seeking his second term as mayor, having first been elected in the previous election in 2005.

Campaign 

Pawlowski would be challenged in the Democratic primary by longtime city employee and former follower Dick Nepon. He would handily defeat Nepon with almost 82% of the vote. Pawlowski's followers also attempted to write him in as the Republican nominee in an effort to cross-file Pawlowski to forego the general election. However, this effort would fail and Tony Phillips would secure the Republican nomination. It is unknown how many write-ins Pawlowski received as a Republican as they where pooled into his total as a Democratic candidate. Pawlowski would go on to defeat Phillips in the general election with almost 74% of the vote.

Results

See also
 2009 United States elections
 Mayors of Allentown, Pennsylvania

References

Allentown
 2009
Allentown